Shrisha Karki was a Nepalese actress and model known for her work in Nepali cinema. She committed suicide by hanging at her home on 13 October 2002. Her death sparked debates over tabloid journalism.

Filmography

References 

2002 deaths
21st-century Nepalese actresses
Nepalese film actresses
Actresses in Nepali cinema
Nepalese female models
Suicides by hanging in Nepal